A fulcrum is the support about which a lever pivots.

Fulcrum may also refer to:

Companies and organizations
 Fulcrum (Anglican think tank), a Church of England think tank
 Fulcrum Press, a British publisher of poetry
 Fulcrum Wheels, a bicycle wheel manufacturer in Italy

Entertainment
 Fulcrum (annual), a United States literary periodical
 Fulcrum (Chuck), the enemy spy organization on the TV series Chuck
 Fulcrum (newspaper), a student newspaper at the University of Ottawa
 Fulcrum (sculpture), a 1987 sculpture in London by Richard Serra
 The Fulcrum (comics), a supreme being in the Marvel Comics universe
 Ahsoka Tano, a character in the animated series Star Wars Rebels who uses the alias Fulcrum
 Agent Alexsandr Kallus, a character from the same series who took the alias Fulcrum after Ahsoka Tano.

Other
 Fulcrum (Antarctica), a geological formation in Antarctica
 Fulcrum (drumming), part of a percussionist's grip
 Fulcrum weeder, a garden tool
 Mikoyan MiG-29, NATO reporting name "Fulcrum", a Soviet fighter aircraft
 Operation Fulcrum, a series of United States nuclear weapons tests in 1976-1977